Carlos Alberto César Büsser (10 January 1928 – 29 September 2012) was an Argentine naval officer who commanded Argentine forces during the 1982 invasion of the Falkland Islands who forced the surrender of the Governor of the Falkland Islands, Rex Hunt. 

Following the Argentine defeat in the Falklands War, he was appointed Chairman of the Joint Chiefs of Staff, a position he held until his retirement in 1983. In 1984, Büsser published the book Operación Rosario, a detailed account of the Argentine landings on the Falklands, and, in 1987, Malvinas, la guerra inconclusa, an overall analysis of the conflict. 

Büsser died of a heart attack in September 2012. He had been under house arrest since 2009, for alleged human rights abuses committed in the Bahía Blanca area during the 1970s dictatorship.

References 

1928 births
2012 deaths
Argentine military personnel of the Falklands War
Argentine Navy admirals
Argentine people of German descent
Burials at La Chacarita Cemetery
Operatives of the Dirty War
People from Rosario, Santa Fe
Prisoners and detainees of Argentina